Cristóbal Alonso Castillo Espinaza (born 4 February 2003) is a Chilean professional footballer who plays as a midfielder for Chilean Primera División side O'Higgins.

Club career
Born in Machalí, Castillo came to O'Higgins F.C. at the age of 10. He became the team captain of the under-13 level, winning the 2016 Youth Football National Championship. He made his professional debut in the 2021 Primera División match against Everton de Viña del Mar on March 27.

International career
He represented Chile U20 at the friendly tournament Copa Rául Coloma Rivas, playing all the matches, and at three friendly matches against Paraguay U20 and Peru U20 on 2022. In September 2022, he made 3 appearances in the Costa Cálida Supercup. In the 2022 South American Games, he made 3 appearances. In 2023, he made three appearances in the South American U20 Championship.

References

External links
 
 Cristóbal Castillo at PlayMakerStats

2003 births
Living people
People from Cachapoal Province
Chilean footballers
Chile under-20 international footballers
Association football midfielders
O'Higgins F.C. footballers
Chilean Primera División players
Competitors at the 2022 South American Games
21st-century Chilean people